Person or Persons Unknown is the fourth historical mystery novel about Sir John Fielding by Bruce Alexander.

Plot summary
Women of the street are being brutally murdered in Covent Garden, and Sir John is baffled.  Worse, one of the Fieldings' acquaintances becomes the prime suspect.

1998 American novels
Sir John Fielding series
Novels set in London
G. P. Putnam's Sons books